Beth Israel ( "House of Israel") may refer to:

Synagogues

Canada
(by province)

 Beth Israel Synagogue (Edmonton)
 Congregation Beth Israel (Vancouver)
 Beth Israel Synagogue (Halifax, Nova Scotia)
 Beth Israel Congregation (Kingston, Ontario)
 Beth Israel Anshei Minsk (Toronto, Ontario)
 Congregation House of Israel (Sainte-Agathe-des-Monts, Quebec)
 Congregation Beth Israel Ohev Sholem, Quebec City, Quebec
 Beth Israel Synagogue (Edenbridge, Saskatchewan)

United States
(by state then city)

 Congregation Beth Israel (Gadsden, Alabama)
 Temple Beth Israel (Phoenix), Arizona, listed on the National Register of Historic Places
 Congregation Beth Israel (Scottsdale, Arizona)
 Congregation Beth Israel (Berkeley, California)
 Temple Beth Israel (Fresno, California)
 Temple Beth Israel of Highland Park and Eagle Rock, Los Angeles, California
 Congregation Beth Israel (San Diego)
 Congregation Beth Israel-Judea, San Francisco, California
 Temple Beth Israel (Hartford, Connecticut)
 Beth Israel Synagogue (New Haven, Connecticut)
 Beth Israel Synagogue (Norwalk, Connecticut)
 Congregation Beth Israel (West Hartford, Connecticut)
 Temple Beth Israel (Macon, Georgia)
 Ahavath Beth Israel (Boise, Idaho)
 Congregation Beth Israel Abraham Voliner, Overland Park, Kansas
 Congregation Beth Israel (New Orleans)
 Congregation Beth Israel (Bangor, Maine)
 Beth Israel Congregation (Salisbury, Maryland)
 Beth Israel Synagogue (Cambridge, Massachusetts)
 Congregation Beth Israel (Malden, Massachusetts)
 Congregation Beth Israel (North Adams, Massachusetts)
 Congregation Beth Israel (Onset, Massachusetts)
 Congregation Beth Israel (Worcester, Massachusetts)
 Beth Israel Congregation (Ann Arbor, Michigan)
 Temple Beth Israel (Jackson, Michigan)
 Beth Israel Congregation (Jackson, Mississippi)
 Congregation Beth Israel (Meridian, Mississippi)
 Temple Beth Israel (Bergen County, New Jersey)
 Congregation Baith Israel Anshei Emes, Brooklyn, New York
 Congregation Beth Israel (Brooklyn), New York
 Congregation Beth Israel West Side Jewish Center, Manhattan, New York
 Temple Beth Israel (Niagara Falls, New York)
 Temple Beth Israel (Plattsburgh, New York)
 Temple Beth Israel (Port Washington, New York)
 Temple of Israel Synagogue (Rockaway Beach, New York)
 Congregation Beth Israel (Asheville, North Carolina)
 Beth Israel Synagogue (Hamilton, Ohio)
 Temple Beth Israel (Eugene, Oregon)
 Congregation Beth Israel (Portland, Oregon)
 Temple Beth Israel (Altoona, Pennsylvania)
 Congregation Beth Israel (Honesdale, Pennsylvania)
 Congregation Beth Israel (Lebanon, Pennsylvania)
 Congregation Beth Israel (Media, Pennsylvania)
 Temple Beth Israel (Sharon, Pennsylvania)
 Beth Israel Congregation of Chester County, Upper Uwchlan, Pennsylvania
 Temple Beth Israel (York, Pennsylvania)
 Beth Israel Congregation (Washington, Pennsylvania)
 Beth Israel Congregation (Beaufort, South Carolina)
 Beth Israel Congregation (Florence, South Carolina)
 Old Beth Israel Synagogue (Greenville, South Carolina)
 Congregation Beth Israel (Austin, Texas)
 Congregation Beth Israel (Colleyville, Texas)
 Congregation Beth Israel (Houston), Texas
 Congregation Beth Israel (Charlottesville, Virginia)
 Beth Israel Synagogue (Roanoke, Virginia)
 Congregation Beth Israel (Bellingham, Washington)
 Congregation Beth Israel (Milwaukee)
 Temple Beth Israel (Stevens Point, Wisconsin), listed on the National Register of Historic Places

Elsewhere

 Beth Israel Synagogue (Oranjestad, Aruba)
 Bet Israel Synagogue (Istanbul)
 Temple Beth Israel, Montevideo, Uruguay

Hospitals

 Beth Israel Deaconess Medical Center in Boston, including the former Beth Israel Hospital
 Beth Israel Deaconess Hospital - Plymouth, a second location in Plymouth, Massachusetts (formerly Jordan Hospital)
 Mount Sinai Beth Israel, in Manhattan, New York, including the former Beth Israel Medical Center
 Newark Beth Israel Medical Center in Newark, New Jersey

Cemeteries 
 Beth Israel Cemetery (Meridian, Mississippi)

Schools
 Beth Israel School, Portland, Oregon, listed on the National Register of Historic Places

See also

 
 
 Beth Israel Hospital (disambiguation)
 Israel (disambiguation)
 Beth (disambiguation)